Pleurodema is a genus of leptodactylid frogs from South America. They are sometimes known under the common name four-eyed frogs, although this name can also refer to a particular species, Pleurodema bibroni. The common name is a reference to two inguinal poison glands that resemble eyes.  When threatened, the frog lowers its head and raises its rear.  When the frog adopts this posture, the poison glands are also raised toward the predator.  The predator may also confuse the frog's raised posterior for the head of a larger animal.

Species
The genus contains only the following 15 species:
 Pleurodema alium Maciel and Nunes, 2010
 Pleurodema bibroni Tschudi, 1838
 Pleurodema borellii (Peracca, 1895)
 Pleurodema brachyops (Cope, 1869)
 Pleurodema bufoninum Bell, 1843
 Pleurodema cinereum Cope, 1878
 Pleurodema cordobae Valetti, Salas, and Martino, 2009
 Pleurodema diplolister (Peters, 1870)
 Pleurodema guayapae Barrio, 1964
 Pleurodema kriegi (Müller, 1926)
 Pleurodema marmoratum (Duméril & Bibron, 1841)
 Pleurodema nebulosum (Burmeister, 1861)
 Pleurodema somuncurense (Cei, 1969)
 Pleurodema thaul (Lesson, 1827)
 Pleurodema tucumanum Parker, 1927

References

 
Leptodactylinae
Amphibians of South America
Amphibian genera
Taxa named by Johann Jakob von Tschudi